The 1996–97 Bulgarian Cup was the 57th season of the Bulgarian Cup. CSKA Sofia won the competition, beating Levski Sofia 3–1 in the final at the Vasil Levski National Stadium in Sofia.

First round

|-
!colspan=3 style="background-color:#D0F0C0;" |12 November 1996

|-
!colspan=3 style="background-color:#D0F0C0;" |13 November 1996

|}

Second round

|-
!colspan=5 style="background-color:#D0F0C0;" |27 November / 5 December 1996

|-
!colspan=5 style="background-color:#D0F0C0;" |4 / 11 December 1996

|-
!colspan=5 style="background-color:#D0F0C0;" |4 / 13 December 1996

|-
!colspan=5 style="background-color:#D0F0C0;" |4 / 18 December 1996

|}

Quarter-finals

|-
!colspan=5 style="background-color:#D0F0C0;" |5 / 19 March 1997

|}

Semi-finals

|-
!colspan=5 style="background-color:#D0F0C0;" |9 / 22, 23 April 1997

|}

Final

Details

References

1996-97
1996–97 domestic association football cups
Cup